The 1987 Commonwealth Final was the fourth running of the Commonwealth Final as part of the qualification for the 1987 Speedway World Championship. The 1987 Final was run on 14 June at the Belle Vue Stadium in Manchester, England, and was part of the World Championship qualifying for riders from the Commonwealth nations.

Riders qualified for the Final from the Australian, British and New Zealand Championships.

1987 Commonwealth Final
14 June
 Manchester, Belle Vue Stadium
Qualification: Top 11 plus 1 reserve to the Overseas Final in Bradford, England

References

See also
 Motorcycle Speedway

1987
World Individual
1987 in British motorsport
1987 in English sport
June 1987 sports events in the United Kingdom
International sports competitions in Manchester